The Energy Innovation and Carbon Dividend Act of 2019 (H.R. 763) is a bill in the United States House of Representatives that proposes a fee on carbon at the point of extraction to encourage market-driven innovation of clean energy technologies to  reduce greenhouse gas emissions. The fees are recycled to citizens in monthly dividends. The act was originally introduced in 2018 with bipartisan support from six co-sponsors and died when the 115th congress ended on 3 January 2019. It is principally based on Citizens' Climate Lobby's carbon fee and dividend proposal, and this organization advocates for the bill.

On 24 January 2019, the bill was introduced into the house by Representative Ted Deutch on behalf of himself and six other original cosponsors.

The bill obtained 86 cosponsors but was not voted on. On April 1, 2021, the bill was reintroduced in the 117th Congress as H.R. 2307, the Energy Innovation and Carbon Dividend Act of 2021.

2018 bill
The Energy Innovation and Carbon Dividend Act of 2018 was a proposed 2018 bill that intended to "create a Carbon Dividend Trust Fund for the American people in order to encourage market-driven innovation of clean energy technologies and market efficiencies which will reduce harmful pollution and leave a healthier, more stable, and more prosperous nation for future generations." The bill was originally introduced by Representative Ted Deutch (D-FL) on November 27, 2018, with bipartisan support from 4 co-sponsors. A companion bill was introduced into the Senate by Chris Coons (D-DE) and Jeff Flake (R-AZ) on December 19, 2018. The bill died when the 115th Congress ended on January 3, 2019. The bill was reintroduced in the 116th Congress as the Energy Innovation and Carbon Dividend Act of 2019.

Description of the bill 
The 2018 bill was intended to:
 Introduce a rising upstream fee on the carbon content of fuels.
 Rebate fee revenues with an equal share to adults with a Social Security number or Taxpayer Identification Number, and a half-share for all minors younger than 19 per household
 Introduce a border carbon adjustment
 Adjust some regulations which would be duplicative, keep others including CAFE vehicle standards

If passed, the 2019 bill would amend the Internal Revenue Code of 1986 to:

 Introduce a carbon tax at the point of extraction, beginning at $15 per metric ton of CO₂-e (carbon dioxide equivalent) and increasing each year by $10 (adjusted by inflation) or more, depending on its effectiveness, with exemptions for fuel used for military and farm purposes and fluorinated gases,
 rebate revenue with an equal share to adults with a Social Security number or Taxpayer Identification Number, and a half-share for all minors and adults younger than 19 per household, and
 introduce a border carbon adjustment on imported carbon-intensive products to discourage companies moving abroad.

It would also make adjustments to the Clean Air Act to limit the Environmental Protection Agency from placing restrictions on greenhouse gas emissions under some conditions.

Cosponsors 
As of December 17, 2020, the bill has 86 sponsors in the House of Representatives from two parties and 23 states.

Reactions 
The Center on Global Energy Policy published a comparison of the 2018 version of the bill to other carbon tax proposals.

Support 
In the weeks following the reintroduction of the bill, several publications including The Washington Post, the Missoulian, and the Daily Camera published op-eds and editorials in support of the bill.

The bill is also supported by climate scientist and activist James Hansen and former secretary of state George Shultz. The governments (or parts of the governments) of several localities, including the following with more than 50,000 residents, have signed resolutions urging the United States Congress to pass the act:

Anchorage, Alaska
Birmingham, Alabama Transit Citizens Advisory Board
Bloomington, Indiana Environmental Commission
Cincinnati, Ohio
Coconut Creek, Florida
Corvallis, Oregon City Council
Durham, North Carolina
Encinitas, California
Hoboken, New Jersey
Jackson, Mississippi
Los Angeles County, California
Olympia, Washington
Palm Beach County, Florida
Richmond, California
Rochester, New York
San Jose, California
Santa Ana, California
Syracuse, New York
Tompkins County, New York

It has also been publicly supported by several small businesses and nonprofit organizations including Protect Our Winters.

The Environmental Defense Fund called it "an inspiring step in the right direction."

Opposition 
The Center for Biological Diversity published a press release opposing the bill on the basis that its adjustments to the Clean Air Act would "only give us climate disaster."

In April 2019, novelist and leading member of Orange County for Climate Action Roger Gloss posted his opposition to HR 763, noting the lack of annual emissions targets, and the first assessment of whether targets are being met in 2030, the year in which the IPCC says emissions must have already been halved.

See also
Carbon tax
Carbon fee and dividend
Citizens' Climate Lobby

References

External links 

Energy Innovation and Carbon Dividend Act

Proposed legislation of the 115th United States Congress
Proposed legislation of the 116th United States Congress
Proposed legislation of the 117th United States Congress